Khomsa is an album by Tunisian oud player Anouar Brahem recorded in 1994 and released on the ECM label.

Reception
The Allmusic review by Michael G. Nastos awarded the album 3 stars calling it "a beautiful contemporary statement reflecting the cinematic forms Brahem loves, mixed with European classical and improvisational sensibilities, professionally rendered, and well within the tradition of world jazz and the clean ECM concept"

Track listing
All compositions by Anouar Brahem except as indicated
 "Comme un Depart" (Richard Gálliano) - 3:32 
 "L 'Infini Jour" - 7:31 
 "Souffle un Vent Sable" (Anouar Brahem, Jon Christensen, Palle Danielsson, Richard Gálliano) - 10:07 
 "Regard de Mouette" - 1:55 
 "Sur l'Infini Bleu" - 5:53 
 "Claquent les Voiles" - 2:09 
 "Vague" - 2:37 
 "E la Nave Va" - 4:41 
 "Ain Ghazel" - 7:32 
 "Khomsa" - 7:01 
 "Seule" - 3:39 
 "Nouvelle Vague" - 2:38 
 "En Robe d'Olivier" - 2:41 
 "Des Rayons et des Ombres" (Christensen, Danielsson, Gálliano) - 8:31 
 "Un Sentier d'Alliance" - 2:41 
 "Comme une Absence" - 3:12 
Recorded at Rainbow Studio in Oslo, Norway in September 1994

Personnel
Anouar Brahem - oud
Richard Galliano - accordion
François Couturier - piano, synthesizer
Jean Marc Larché - soprano saxophone
Béchir Selmi - violin
Palle Danielsson - double bass
Jon Christensen - drums

References

1995 albums
ECM Records albums
Anouar Brahem albums
Albums produced by Manfred Eicher